Lawrence Columbus "Crash" Davis (July 14, 1919 – August 31, 2001) was an American professional baseball player whose name inspired that of the main character of the 1988 movie Bull Durham.

Biography
Born in Canon, Georgia, and raised in Gastonia, North Carolina, Davis earned the nickname "Crash" at age 14, when he collided with a teammate when chasing down a fly ball. Davis excelled as a middle infielder at Duke University, where he was the captain of the baseball team and a member of the Chi Phi Fraternity until he graduated in 1940.

After graduating from Duke, Davis played three seasons for the Philadelphia Athletics, batting .230 in 148 games. He was drafted into the United States Navy in 1942 amid World War II, and was assigned to Harvard University, where he helped run the ROTC program. Davis also coached Harvard's baseball and squash teams.

When he was discharged from the Navy in 1946, Davis returned to Durham to begin graduate school at Duke and play for the Durham Bulls, then a part of the Carolina League. Davis would play in the minor leagues, with teams including the Reidsville Luckies and the Raleigh Capitals, until 1952.

After Bull Durham was released, Davis became a minor celebrity. He befriended the director of the film, Ron Shelton, and Shelton gave him a bit part in his movie Cobb about controversial baseball player Ty Cobb.

Sometime during the mid 1950s, Davis began working for the textile conglomerate Burlington Industries at their Gastonia Plant and advanced to become the Personnel Manager for the Domestics Division in Greensboro, NC, until his retirement until the mid 1980s.  

Davis died on August 31, 2001, from complications of stomach cancer.

External links

The Legend of the Real Crash Davis Philadelphia Athletics Historical Society
Remembering Crash Davis at Baseball America

1919 births
2001 deaths
Duke Blue Devils baseball players
Philadelphia Athletics players
Baseball players from Georgia (U.S. state)
Baseball players from Philadelphia
Major League Baseball second basemen
United States Navy personnel of World War II
Lawrence Millionaires players
Pawtucket Slaters players
Durham Bulls players
Raleigh Capitals players
Reidsville Luckies players
People from Franklin County, Georgia
People from Gastonia, North Carolina
Deaths from cancer in North Carolina
Deaths from stomach cancer
Harvard Crimson baseball coaches
Harvard Crimson men's squash